Piz Sezner (2,310 m) is a mountain of the Swiss Lepontine Alps, overlooking Obersaxen in the canton of Graubünden. It is located between the main Rhine valley and the Val Lumnezia.

In winter, the mountain is part of a ski area. A cable car station is located west of the summit at 2,269 metres.

See also
List of mountains of Switzerland accessible by public transport

References

External links
 Piz Sezner on Hikr

Mountains of Graubünden
Mountains of the Alps
Lepontine Alps
Mountains of Switzerland
Two-thousanders of Switzerland